La Bidonata, also known as The Rip-off, is a once lost 1977 Italian comedy/crime film. This was the final film directed by giallo director Luciano Ercoli.

Cast
 Walter Chiari: Renato
 Maurizio Arena: Maurizio
 Ettore Manni: Ettore
 Marisa Merlini: Marìa
 Susan Scott: Ornella 
 Venantino Venantini: The Frenchman 
 Vittorio Caprioli: Benjamin Bronchi
 Franca Valeri: Giovanna Bronchi

Production
Before the film's premier executive producer Niccolo De Nora was kidnapped. Soon after "La Bidonata" was shelved. Debate continues on whether the film was shelved due to the kidnapping of the producer or for the fact the film played poorly to test audiences. Either way the film was pulled and all elements were presumed lost. No promotional materials were printed and Luciano Ercoli's final film would become lost for nearly thirty years. A print however was discovered in a box that was supposed to contain Japanese cartoons. The print was shipped off to an LVR lab where after examination they announced that it was in remarkably good condition. This one surviving print was used for the NoShame DVD release.

Releases
The film released on Region 0 NTSC DVD by NoShame films in 2006. Because of the obscurity of the film, NoShame included it as a bonus with the film Colt 38 Special Squad. The DVD is currently out-of-print.

References

External links

1977 films
Italian comedy films
1970s Italian-language films
1970s action films
1970s crime thriller films
Films directed by Luciano Ercoli
Films scored by Stelvio Cipriani
1970s Italian films